Bama Vijayam may refer to:
 Bama Vijayam (1934 film)
 Bama Vijayam (1967 film)

See also 
 Bhama Vijayam